Joseph Everett Warner (May 16, 1884 – May 30, 1958) was a U.S. politician who served as the Speaker of the Massachusetts House of Representatives from 1919 to 1920, as the Attorney General of Massachusetts from 1928 to 1935, and as a Justice of the Massachusetts Superior Court from 1940 until his death in 1958.

Warner was born in Taunton, Massachusetts, on May 16, 1884, to Richard Everett Warner and  Ida Evelyn (Briggs) Warner.
Warner graduated from Harvard College and Harvard Law School.

Warner was a delegate to the 1920 Republican National Convention. 
 
In 1940 Gov. Leverett Saltonstall appointed Warner to be a Justice of the Massachusetts Superior Court.

Warner died in his home of a heart attack on May 30, 1958.

See also
 1915 Massachusetts legislature
 1916 Massachusetts legislature
 1917 Massachusetts legislature
 1918 Massachusetts legislature
 1919 Massachusetts legislature
 1920 Massachusetts legislature

References

1884 births
1958 deaths
Massachusetts city council members
Speakers of the Massachusetts House of Representatives
Massachusetts Attorneys General
Republican Party members of the Massachusetts House of Representatives
Harvard Law School alumni
1920 United States presidential election
Politicians from Taunton, Massachusetts
Massachusetts Superior Court justices
20th-century American judges
Harvard College alumni
20th-century American politicians